No hay 2 sin 3 (No 2 without 3) was an Argentine comedy television series emitted in 2004 and 2006. It was broadcast on Canal 9 in prime time at 20.30 pm during 2004 and 2006. It stars Pablo Granados, Pachu Peña and Freddy Villarreal, and Jose Maria Listorti replacing Pablo Granados in 2006.

References

Argentine comedy television series
2004 Argentine television series debuts
2005 Argentine television series endings